Hugh Victor ("Vic") Halbert (17 January 1910 – 31 January 1997) was an Australian politician.

Biography
Born in Meckering, Western Australia, he was educated at Hale School in Perth before becoming an accountant, tax agent and retail businessman. In 1958, he was elected to the Australian House of Representatives as the Liberal member for Moore, defeating Country Party member Hugh Leslie. Leslie regained the seat in 1961 and Halbert retired from politics, becoming a company director. In 1965, he was elected President of the Western Australian Liberal Party, a position he held until 1969. Halbert died in 1997.

References

Liberal Party of Australia members of the Parliament of Australia
Members of the Australian House of Representatives for Moore
Members of the Australian House of Representatives
1910 births
1997 deaths
20th-century Australian politicians